Giulio Spinola (1612–1691) was a Roman Catholic cardinal.

Biography
On 10 Feb 1658, was consecrated bishop by Girolamo Boncompagni, Archbishop of Bologna, with Tommaso Carafa, Bishop of Capaccio, and Bartolomeo Cresconi, Bishop of Caserta, serving as co-consecrators.

Episcopal succession
While bishop, he was the principal consecrator of:

References

1612 births
1691 deaths
17th-century Italian cardinals
Apostolic Nuncios to the Holy Roman Empire
Cardinals created by Pope Alexander VII
Clergy from Genoa